Dorneyville Crossroad Settlement is a complex of three historic buildings, which are located in the crossroads community of Dorneyville in South Whitehall Township in Lehigh County, Pennsylvania. They are the King George Inn, John Dorney House, and William Dorney House.

History and architectural features
The King George Inn is a large stone building that was erected in four sections. The oldest dates to roughly 1755, with additions made circa 1790, 1796 and 1930. It was operated as an inn and tavern. 

The John Dorney House and William Dorney House are two stone dwellings that were built sometime around 1832 and 1835, respectively. They are representative of the Georgian style.

This complex was listed on the National Register of Historic Places in 1977.

Present day
The King George Inn, which had operated as a tavern or restaurant since 1756, closed unexpectedly in August 2012. It is scheduled for demolition.

References 

Buildings and structures on the National Register of Historic Places in Pennsylvania
Georgian architecture in Pennsylvania
Buildings and structures in Lehigh County, Pennsylvania
National Register of Historic Places in Lehigh County, Pennsylvania